Astrothelium nigrocacuminum is a species of corticolous (bark-dwelling) lichen in the family Trypetheliaceae. Found in Bolivia, it was formally described as a new species in 2016 by lichenologists Adam Flakus, Martin Kukwa, and André Aptroot. It is only known to occur in the type locality. The species epithet alludes to the blackened tops of the ascomata, which protrude from the thallus. Astrothelium megochroleucum is most similar in appearance, but, unlike A. nigrocacuminum, that species has apical ostioles and stroma that fluoresce when lit with a long-wavelength UV light.

References

nigrocacuminum
Lichen species
Lichens described in 2016
Lichens of Bolivia
Taxa named by André Aptroot
Taxa named by Adam Grzegorz Flakus